Ptilodon is a genus of moths belonging to the family Notodontidae.

The species of this genus are found in Eurasia.

Species:
 Ptilodon atrofusa Hampson, 1892 
 Ptilodon capucina (Linnaeus, 1758)

References

Notodontidae
Moth genera